Singin may refer to:

Singin'..., a 1977 album by Melissa Manchester
Singin, the Ottoman name for Shëngjin, Albania